A Family Affair is an album by Christian McBride. It was recorded in California and released in 1998 by Verve.

Reception
Bill Milkowski of JazzTimes noted "On his third album as a leader, bassist Christian McBride reveals more shades of his musical makeup than he's allowed to slip through in the past. Along with his renowned upright chops-typically solid and swinging in the great tradition of Ray Brown-the Philly phenom also reveals himself to be a Bootsy-influenced funkster, Jamerson-inspired groovemeister, and Jacoesque fretless electric soloist. All this, plus his first stab at lyric writing, makes A Family Affair McBride's most diverse and widely appealing project to date." Jim Santella of All About Jazz said "The toe-tapping music swings deliciously and is presented in a variety of different formats."

Dan MacIntosh of Jelly Roll wrote "This album may not be the best forum for Christian McBride's music, but it's always fun to get a peek at a musician's influences. Instead of labeling this as a sell-out (which it very easily could have become), A Family Affair is better viewed as a side road along the fruitful journey of one diverse musician."

Phil Gallo of Variety wrote, "After two acoustic jazz albums for Verve and roles in the bands of Benny Green and Joshua Redman, he has turned to electric jazz for his "Family Affair" disc and marries funk and post-bop in a bountiful performance... He has yet to distinguish himself with a similar uniqueness on the electric bass. He does what others before him have done without necessarily expanding those concepts. But when he's thinking funk and classic jazz at the same time, as he does on "Brown Funk," a tribute to bassist Ray and singer James, he's headed in a direction that can only be good for the future of this music."

Track listing

Personnel
Christian McBride – double bass, bass guitar, keyboards
Tim Warfield – tenor saxophone
Charles Craig – keyboards
Russell Malone – guitar
Gregory Hutchinson – drums
Munyungo Jackson – percussion
Will Downing – vocals
Vesta – vocals

Production
Chika Azuma – art direction, design
Corine Duke – production co-ordination
George Duke – producer
Beverly Harris – release co-ordinator
Eric Johnson – photography
Estée Ochoa – stylist
Doug Sax – mastering
Richard Seidel – executive producer
Camille Tominaro – production co-ordination
Erik Zobler – engineer, mixing
Robert Zuckerman – photography

Chart performance

References

External links
Christian McBride discography

Christian McBride albums
1998 albums
Verve Records albums